Tan Wee Gieen (born 14 May 1994) is a Malaysian badminton player. He started playing badminton at home when he was 9 years old and influenced by his family. His brothers, Tan Wee Kiong and Tan Wee Tat are also professional badminton players.

Achievements

BWF World Tour (1 runner-up)
The BWF World Tour, announced on 19 March 2017 and implemented in 2018, is a series of elite badminton tournaments, sanctioned by Badminton World Federation (BWF). The BWF World Tour are divided into six levels, namely World Tour Finals, Super 1000, Super 750, Super 500, Super 300 (part of the HSBC World Tour), and the BWF Tour Super 100.

Men's doubles

BWF International Challenge/Series (6 runners-up)
Men's doubles

Mixed doubles

  BWF International Challenge tournament
  BWF International Series tournament
  BWF Future Series tournament

References

External links 
 

Living people
1994 births
People from Muar
People from Johor
Malaysian sportspeople of Chinese descent
Malaysian male badminton players
21st-century Malaysian people